Educate Now is a non-profit education reform organization founded in 2008 and based in New Orleans, Louisiana. Its founder is education reform advocate and former State Board of Elementary and Secondary Education (BESE) member Leslie Jacobs. Ms. Jacobs was a key architect of Louisiana’s Recovery School District and is a former Orleans Parish School Board member.

The organization is chiefly focused on sustaining and enhancing the major transformation and reorganization of the previously failing public school system in New Orleans. Educate Now is a strong supporter of decentralized school administration, including the expansion of publicly funded charter schools, and performance metrics as major components of public school reform.

In addition to its advocacy role, Educate Now also serves as a source for information on school performance and education policy, with an emphasis on highlighting innovative and effective means for enhancing and facilitating school reform. Educate NOW! has become a useful tool that provides in-depth information regarding education such as school governance, facilities, academics and enrollment.  In addition to providing current news, the website also has an extensive archive of relative articles.

History
Educate Now began in October 2008 by founder Leslie Jacobs. In addition to Ms. Jacobs, Educate Now also boasts a diverse group of education, business and community leaders as an advisory board.

Stated Mission
Educate Now's self-described mission is to:
Provide current, comprehensive information on education reform in New Orleans
Lend programmatic support to educational reforms already underway in New Orleans
Advocate for decentralized, quality public schools for all students in New Orleans

Current operations
Educate Now provides up-to-date information regarding school performance, facilities planning and education policy. In addition, the website features commentary from Ms. Jacobs on performance results, policy and ongoing reform progress. A parents’ guide to school choice and links to enrollment information for open-admission public schools throughout Louisiana is also available online and in PDF form.

In concert with serving as a convenient clearinghouse for Louisiana State-administered LEAP testing data, Educate Now publishes its own independent analysis of school performance scores and student test results. Membership to Educate Now is free and open to the public and provides the member with email newsletter updates, Ms. Jacobs' notebook commentary, and policy action alerts.

Advisory board
The current board consists of:
Arnold Baker, President - Baker Ready Mix and Building Materials
Matt Candler, CEO & Founder, 4.0 Schools
Mike Cowan, Executive Director - Common Good, Loyola University New Orleans
Daniel Davillier, Chairman - New Orleans Regional Black Chamber of Commerce
Nick Gross, Business Development Analyst - Greater New Orleans, Inc.
Kira Orange Jones, Executive Director - Greater New Orleans Teach for America
Shannon Jones, Executive Director - The Cowen Institute for Public Education Initiatives, Tulane University
Jay Lapeyre, Chairman – New Orleans Business Council & President of Laitram, LLC
Nash Molphus, Associate Director – The Cowen Institute for Public Education Initiatives, Tulane University
Dr. Brian Riedlinger, CEO – The School Leadership Center of Greater New Orleans
Caroline Roemer, Executive Director – The LA Public Charter School Association
Nolan V. Rollins, President – The Urban League of Greater New Orleans
Sarah Newell Usdin, Founder – New Schools for New Orleans
Gina Warner, Executive Director – Afterschool Partnership for Greater New Orleans

References

External links

Education issues
Education reform
Education in Louisiana
Charter schools in the United States